Bill Fleckenstein is a financial columnist and former hedge fund manager.

He is a 1979 graduate of University of Washington in mathematics.

He contributes to Financial Sense.

Publications

References 

Year of birth missing (living people)
Living people
American financial writers
American hedge fund managers
University of Washington alumni